Fuel Direct is a United Kingdom government policy whereby an individual on certain income related benefits can have a certain amount of their benefit money deducted in order to pay off fuel debts.

See also
Welfare state in the United Kingdom

References

Welfare state in the United Kingdom